Normantown may refer to:
 Normantown, West Virginia
 Normantown, Georgia